This is a list of air shows in Australia.

Canberra

New South Wales
 Wings over Illawarra, (Illawarra)
 Warbirds Down Under Airshow, Temora

Northern Territory

Queensland
Bundaberg Air show 2009

South Australia
Jamestown Airshow (annually)

Edinburgh Airshow

Tasmania

Victoria
 Australian International Air Show (Avalon Airport) (Biennial)
 Gathering of the Moths at Mount Beauty Airport.
 Kyneton Air Show (Kyneton)
 Lilydale Air Show
 Tyabb Air Show (Biennial)

Western Australia

References

 Australia
Australia aviation-related lists
Aviation in Australia